Joan of Navarre, also known as Joanna ( – 10 June 1437) was Duchess of Brittany by marriage to Duke John IV and later Queen of England as the second wife of King Henry IV. She served as regent of Brittany from 1399 until 1403 during the minority of her son. She also served as regent of England during the absence of her stepson Henry V in 1415. Four years later he imprisoned her and confiscated her money and land. Joan was released in 1422, shortly before Henry V's death.

Joan was a daughter of Charles II of Navarre and Joan of France.

Duchess of Brittany
On 2 October 1386, Joan married her first husband, Duke John IV of Brittany (known in traditional English sources as John V). She was his third wife and the only one with whom he had children. 

John IV died on 1 November 1399 and was succeeded by his and Joan's son, John V. Her son being still a minor, she was made his guardian and the regent of Brittany during his minority. Not long after, King Henry IV of England proposed to marry her. The marriage proposal was given out of mutual personal preference rather than a dynastic marriage. According to the Encyclopædia Britannica, affection developed between Joan and Henry while he resided at the Breton court during his banishment from England. Joan gave a favourable reply to the proposal, but stated that she could not go through with it until she had set the affairs of Brittany in order and arranged for the security of the duchy and her children.

Joan knew that it would not be possible for her to continue as regent of Brittany after having married the king of England, nor would she be able to take her sons with her to England. A papal dispensation was necessary for the marriage, which was obtained in 1402. She negotiated with the duke of Burgundy to make him guardian of her sons and regent of Brittany. Finally, she surrendered the custody of her sons and her power as regent of Brittany to the duke of Burgundy, who swore to respect the Breton rights and law, and departed for England with her daughters.

Queen of England

On 7 February 1403, Joan married Henry IV at Winchester Cathedral. On the 26th, she held her formal entry to London, where she was crowned queen of England.
Queen Joan was described as beautiful, gracious and majestic, but also as greedy and stingy, and was accused of accepting bribes. Reportedly, she did not have a good impression of England, as a Breton ship was attacked outside the English coast just after her wedding. She preferred the company of her Breton entourage, which caused offence to such a degree that her Breton courtiers were exiled by order of Parliament, a ban the king did not think he could oppose given his sensitive relation to the Parliament at the time.

Joan and Henry had no surviving children, but it appears that in 1403 Joan gave birth to stillborn twins. She is recorded as having had a good relationship with Henry's children from his first marriage, often taking the side of the future Henry V in his quarrels with his father. Her daughters returned to France three years after their arrival on the order of their brother, her son.

Queen dowager
In 1413, her second spouse died, succeeded by her stepson Henry V. Joan had a very good relationship with Henry, who allowed her use of his royal castles of Windsor, Wallingford, Berkhamsted and Hertford during his absence in France in 1415. Upon his return, however, he brought her son Arthur of Brittany with him as a prisoner. Joan unsuccessfully tried to have him released. This apparently damaged her relationship with Henry.

In August 1419 the goods of her personal confessor, Friar Randolph, were confiscated, although the itemised list shows the objects actually belonged to Joan. The following month, Randolph came before Parliament and claimed that Joan had "plotted and schemed for the death and destruction of our said lord the King in the most evil and terrible manner imaginable". Her large fortune was confiscated and she was imprisoned at Pevensey Castle in Sussex and later at Leeds Castle in Kent. She was released upon the order of Henry V in 1422, six weeks before he died.

After her release, her fortune was returned to her, and she lived the rest of her life quietly and comfortably with her own court at Nottingham Castle, through Henry V's reign and into that of his son, Henry VI. She died at Havering-atte-Bower in Essex and was buried in Canterbury Cathedral next to Henry IV.

John Foxholes, of Cheryton, in Hampshire is described as her "receiver general" in 1433.

Issue
 Joan (Nantes, 12 August 1387 – 7 December 1388).
 Isabelle (October 1388 – December 1388).
 John V, Duke of Brittany (Château de l'Hermine, near Vannes, Morbihan, 24 December 1389 – manoir de La Touche, near Nantes 29 August 1442).
 Marie (Nantes, 18 February 1391 – 18 December 1446), Lady of La Guerche, married at the Château de l'Hermine (Vannes) on 26 June 1398 to John I of Alençon.
 Margaret (1392 – 13 April 1428), Lady of Guillac, married on 26 June 1407, Alain IX, Viscount of Rohan and Count of Porhoët (d. 1462)
 Arthur III, Duke of Brittany (Château de Succinio, 24 August 1393 – Nantes, 26 December 1458).
 Gilles (1394 – Cosne-sur-Loire, 19 July 1412), Lord of Chantocé and Ingrande.
 Richard (1395 – Château de Clisson 2 June 1438), Count of Benon, Étampes, and Mantes, married at the Château de Blois, Loir-et-Cher on 29 August 1423 Margaret d'Orléans, Countess of Vertus, daughter of Louis of Valois, Duke of Orléans.
 Blanche (1397 – bef. 1419), married at Nantes on 26 June 1407 John IV, Count of Armagnac.
 Stillborn twins (1403)

Ancestry

References

External links

 Profile from English Heritage
 Ceremonial de la Coronación, Unción y Exequias de los Reyes de Inglaterra in Historia Medieval del Reyno de Navarra

|-

|-

Irish royal consorts
1368 births
1437 deaths
English royal consorts
Navarrese infantas
House of Évreux
14th-century women rulers
Ladies of the Garter
Duchesses of Brittany
Regents of Brittany
Regents of England
14th-century English nobility
15th-century English nobility
14th-century Breton people
14th-century nobility from the Kingdom of Navarre
14th-century English women
15th-century English women
14th-century French women
Henry IV of England
Burials at Canterbury Cathedral
15th-century women rulers
Daughters of kings
Wives of knights